Valeri Simeonov Simeonov (born 14 March 1955) is a Bulgarian politician who is one of the leaders and founding members of the National Front for the Salvation of Bulgaria.

Biography
Born in Dolni Chiflik, Simeonov has a degree in electrical engineering from TU-Sofia.

In the 1990s he founded the SKAT cable network in the city of Burgas. As was customary for Bulgarian cable networks at the time, the SKAT company soon started its own TV channels. The cable TV network is currently one of the main competitors in Southwestern Bulgaria.

He was associated with the Attack party through his SKAT TV, but left the party and withdrew his support from Volen Siderov in November 2009.

In 2017 he was appointed head of the Bulgarian Council on Ethnic Minority Integration, which deals with the local Turkish and Romani minorities. He once referred to Roma as “feral humanoids.”

Simeonov served as the Deputy Prime Minister of Bulgaria in charge of economy and demographic policies as part of the Borisov cabinet until his resignation on 16 November 2018 following a public outcry and protests that resulted from a controversial statement he had made on 19 October 2018 regarding the mothers of children with disabilities.

References

1955 births
Living people
People from Varna Province
Members of the National Assembly (Bulgaria)
Bulgarian nationalists
Bulgarian conservatives